The Caledonia Mill was a historic mill building located in Caledonia, Ontario, Canada. Built in 1846, it is a heritage property under the Ontario Heritage Act. It was the last timber-frame water-powered mill along the Grand River in Ontario. In 2018 the mill was dismantled by Riverside properties and was rebuilt as an office complex.

Location
The Caledonia Mill was located on the banks of the Canadian Heritage Grand River, in Caledonia, Ontario Canada.

History
The Old Mill is thought to have been built . From then to 1892, it would seem the flour milling industry in Caledonia was big business but not without competition across the river or financial difficulty.
Caledonia founder Ranald McKinnon's milling enterprises on the Northside by 1850 comprised a sawmill, flour mill, and woollen mill. This Northside area of mill was known to be within the Village of Oneida. James Little's Southside mill was known to be within the Village of Sunnyside.

Doomed by fire and daunted by flood, McKinnon had his share of bad luck with mills. His sawmill, many times damaged by ice and shifted off its location by the 1861 flood, lasted until it burned in January 1942. The 1844 flour mill was rebuilt twice following fires in 1862 and 1876 and remained until Sept. 6, 1969 when fire struck again for the last time. The 1848 woollen mill burned and was rebuilt in 1863 but was left down after claimed arson took it in 1881, two years following McKinnon's death.
The Southside mill, left free from fire and flood, withstood and still remains over 150 years later.

Our concentration on the flour mills only is where the claimed big milling business of the 1860 and 70's took place. Up to then the two flour mills can only be presumed to have either been rented or managed for Little and McKinnon. Daniel McQuarrie was in partnership with McKinnon in the Northside mill from 1865 to 1869. This partnership came to a close and McQuarrie and James Thorburn bought the Southside mill known as Balmoral Mills, renaming it Grand River Mills.

In 1873 William Munro joined McQuarrie and Thorburn to buy out McKinnon's flour milling business.
Thus, the trio had the successful flour business in Caledonia all to themselves. The fire that required rebuilding of the Northside mill in 1876 didn't hold them back. The partnership was said to have the largest dealers in grain in the County of Haldimand.

The Haldimand Atlas of 1877 also states they were turning out 1500 barrels weekly, paying out in cash a half million dollars annually, shipping mostly to Montreal where it was sold in the lower provinces of Canada and Europe.

In 1877 they shipped 6000 barrels direct to Glasgow, Scotland. Employment to about 40 men added to the prosperity of the village.

The Caledonia Dam was registered to them under a "Bargain and Sale" from the Haldimand Navigation Company in 1875. Purchasing and improvements cost $5,000 which allowed them to furnish water power to McKinnon's Woollen mill and a plaster mill.

They were anxious to secure the erection of some other manufacturing establishment to which they  would furnish water power at a reasonable rate. Things seemed to be going very well for McQuarrie, Thorburn, and Munro, according to the 1877 atlas.

But in 1880 the golden years of the partnership came to an abrupt halt and they were declared bankrupt. One wonders what part the 1876 rebuilding of the Northside mill played in the financial difficulty, and or just how true the hype really was in the 1877 Haldimand Atlas account.

The Northside mill was taken over by Robert Shirra.

Scott Brothers

It was an employee of Grand River Mills, William Scott, a younger brother-in-law of Munro, who wanted to see the milling of flour continue at the Southside mill. So he formed a partnership called Scott Brothers in which he was joined by his brothers Samuel and Hugh and his brother-in-law Simeon Hewitt, a lawyer, of Brantford.

Samuel Scott and Simeon Hewitt are claimed to be the financial principals. Robert Shirra paid $14,000 for undivided half of the rights and privileges in the dam, Samuel Scott paid $9,800 for an undivided half of the rights and privileges in the dam.
An agreement of January 1880 stated that William and High Scott, and Robert Shirra each of the two parties would be responsible for an undivided half of the dam, water and maintenance.

In Feb. 1884 a declaration of trust stated that Samuel, William and Hugh Scott and Simeon Hewitt as owners in equal shares of Balmoral Mills including share in the dam.

Samuel Scott died in 1886 and in time William became convinced that their mill might be better served another way. He canvassed many of his farmer friends and customers for miles around Caledonia persuading them to invest in shares of a new milling firm. There were successful examples in other milling establishments. And so on Feb 16, 1892 The Caledonia Milling Company Limited received its provincial charter and in March, 1892 a Bargain and Sale was recorded: "William Scot and wife and Hugh Scott and wife to The Caledonia Milling Co. Ltd. Supposed flouring mill and an undivided interest in Dam #5 – 2 acres, 2 roods, 9 perches." (A rood is the fourth part of an acre, and a perch is a land measure of 5 and a half yards).

The Caledonia Milling Company Limited

The Caledonia Milling Company (Limited) received its charter February 16, 1892 with capital stock of $25,000, divided into 500 shares of $50 each. Each shareholder was to pay 20% on or before the first day of December 1891 and the balance at six percent per annum was due within one year.

The new Caledonia Milling Company (Limited) would be taking over the manufacturing and merchant milling business of the firm of Scott Brothers of the Town of Caledonia in the County of Haldimand. Farmers would be forming a joint stock company for the purpose of purchasing and taking over the business of what we know today as the Old Mill and all other businesses and property owned by Scott Brothers. William Scott would manage the business for the company.

A provisional Board of Directors was set up to pay necessary preliminary and promotion expenses and then to pay Scott Brothers for the business and property within three years from the date of the incorporation. When one half of the stock was subscribed and 20% paid, application was made for the incorporation of The Caledonia Milling Company (Limited). The Provisional Board of Directors had to approve the subscriptions for stock.

According to the prospectus for purchasing, the property which was located partly in the town of Caledonia and partly in the Township of Oneida consisted of a large modern and recently refitted and improved roller mill known as "The Balmoral Mills" with about three acres of land, ownership of one-half interest in the dam across the Grand River and of all rights connected, two Flour and Feed Stores together with the lands on which they stood and a large storage and shipping warehouse on the lands of the Grand Trunk Railway Company at their station in Caledonia.

Caledonia, at the time was said to be the centre of one of the wealthiest and finest wheat producing districts in Canada, the water power hard to equal and the railway shipping facilities all that could be desired.

The Balmoral Flouring Mill, formerly a four run stone mill of first class reputation, had a modern improved system of patent rolls with an easy capacity of 100 barrels per day. Its flour had earned a high reputation in the general markets and commanded a ready sale. At the time of incorporation it was run by water power rarely equalled in the province which would add to the profits of the business.

The Village Flour and Feed Store composed part of lot number one on the west side of Argyle Street corner of Caithness St. However, the new Milling Company would own the entire building which contained the head office, and two other stores as well as the upper storeys which would be rented at remunerative prices. It was said to be one of the most valuable properties in the town.

The other store known as the Caledonia Flour and Feed Store was on the east side of Wigton Street, on the second division of lot number 10, Southside of Forfar Street, and was said also to be a valuable property and a good business.

There were storehouses in connection with the flour and feed stores that were capable of storing large quantities of grain too.
The storehouse on lands of the Grand Trunk Railway Company was under a ground lease from Grand Trunk, had a switch from the railway in connection with it and had capital facilities for storing and shipping.

Later history

The Caledonia Milling Company surrendered its charter in 1964. Immediately, the mills and their adjoining properties were sold off to a company by the name of LH&J Enterprises, made up of three gentlemen. In the early 1970s, it seems that LH&J had sold the north mill and were leasing the south mill to Jan and Leona Buta.

The north mill burned September 6, 1969.

Through a change of hands, the south mill was purchased by the Grand River Conservation Authority, who were hoping to turn the site into a conservation area and park. In 1979, they put the mill up for demolition. A committee of the Golden Horseshoe Antique Society saved the mill from demolition by having it designated under the Ontario Heritage Act through the Haldimand County LACAC (Local Architectural Conservation Advisory Committee).

The Golden Horseshoe Mill Committee put up a new roof, and re-painted the mill building. In 1998, The Caledonia Old Mill Corporation was formed by community members to take over the restoration of the mill. In 2017, the Mill was sold for $1 to Riverside properties who have since demolished the structure and plan to turn the site into an office complex.

Construction (architecture)

Power
The Caledonia Mill was powered by three water turbines. One being significantly smaller than the others. Most lineshafting which connects leather belts and pulleys to machinery is still connected to the turbines which are currently still in place.

Equipment
The Mill contained a large amount of its machinery, as well as machinery transported from Apps Mill near Brantford, Ontario. Machinery on display in the mill prior to demolition included: Roller Mills, centrifugal flour dresser, swing-sieve sifter, several bolting reels, separators, purifiers, and bucket elevator systems.

Later extensions
There have been two major additions to the Mill. The first occurred in the 1880s when a two-story L-shaped addition was added. The second was a two-story annex added in the 1900s. The three sections combine to make up the look of mill as it stands today.

The Mill featured a distinctive cupola, a decorative feature rarely seen in Canadian mills of the era. The cupola gave a view of the Grand River Bridge, the only nine-span bridge in Canada. It is likely that this cupola was used to allow light to shine on lineshafting on the top floor of the building.

Usage
The Mill building was demolished by Riverside Properties in 2018 and work has commenced on the construction of an office complex.

Owners
The land on which the Mill once stood is now owned by Riverside Properties. The river-front park is owned by Haldimand County, and the Millrace or Head race is owned by the Grand River Conservation Authority.

Tenants
For a short time in the 2000s, the Mill was utilized by the Grand Mill Theatre Company who used the main floor as a performing arts space.

Public access
In 2011, the mill was included in Doors Open Haldimand County. The river-front park is utilized by many organizations because of its scenic location along the Grand River.

Notable events
From 2008 to 2016 the Caledonia Mill was home to one of the largest winter light displays in Southern Ontario. The display which ran each year from late November to early January attracts thousands. A large number of holiday lights are synchronized to popular holiday music.

Culture & media
The Caledonia Mill is featured on many websites including Facebook, YouTube, and on the website for the Caledonia Old Mill Corporation.

See also
 Caledonia Dam
 Haldimand House

Reference Notes

Bibliography

External links
 Old Mill Corporation Website
 Caledonia Mill History
 Tourism Caledonia Website

Watermills in Canada
Buildings and structures in Haldimand County
Grinding mills in Canada
Grand River (Ontario)
Industrial buildings in Ontario